The 1975 Winston Western 500 was a NASCAR Winston Cup Series racing event that took place on January 19, 1975, at Riverside International Raceway in Riverside, California. A companion race known as the Permatex 200, in the Late Model Sportsmen Series,  would be held one day prior to this event on the same track.

The 1975 NASCAR Winston Cup Series would jump start Richard Petty into a different breed of stock car driver; even though his 1975 Dodge Charger muscle car vehicle would be as comfortable to drive on the race track as a boxcar on the railroad tracks.

This was the first race that the vaunted Chevrolet Malibu Laguna S-3 was eligible for competition, although its use began in earnest at the 1975 Daytona 500.

Race report
Fifty-five thousand people would attend a live racing event that would last for five hours and four minutes. Ivan Baldwin would become the last-place finisher due to engine problems on the fourth lap. Bobby Allison and David Pearson both chased each other for the lead lap before Allison would win by nearly 23 seconds over Pearson. Other drivers who had the lead at certain points in the race were Sonny Easley and Ray Elder. More than half the field failed to finish the race due to problems ranging from engine difficulties to oil-related problems and even the occasional transmission problem.

Only 13 cars were running at the end of the race; only Bobby Allison, David Pearson, Cecil Gordon, and Dave Marcis had a realistic shot of winning the race. Most of the teams were feeling their way through since it was the first race of the year and teams had to experiment with new strategies. The broadcasting range provided by the network was questionable at best despite being televised specifically for cable television. Most of the Northern United States (including New Jersey) were nearly oblivious to the events that occurred. The results were shown primarily through tape-delayed highlight shows and amateurish NASCAR magazines.

Richard Petty would spend 19 laps on pit road while the crew repaired the left front of his car; using a lot of Arno 200 MPH tape in the process. The car looked like a candidate for the junkyard but Petty later roared around the track faster than eventual race winner Bobby Allison. Petty even passed Allison a few times in the process. Attrition was considered to be a considerable issue at the race as only 13 cars were running at; with only one other car within 7 laps of the lead, at a track bigger than Watkins Glen.

This would be the last NASCAR Winston Cup series race for G.T. Tallas. He'd return to NASCAR 20 years later to run two races in the NASCAR Truck Series.

While multi-car teams were becoming the norm, a significant amount of "lone wolf" owners still were operating in 1975.

Prize amounts earned for each driver ranged from $14,735 ($ when adjusted for inflation) to $520 ($ when adjusted for inflation); with a grand total of $97,075 being handed out by the official NASCAR treasurer ($ when adjusted for inflation). Ron Esau, Don Puskarich, and Bill Schmitt would make their introductions to NASCAR in this race while Dick Bown would hang up his racing gloves after this event.

Qualifying

Failed to qualify: Dennis Wilson (#61W)

Finishing order
Section reference: 

 Bobby Allison
 David Pearson
 Cecil Gordon
 Dave Marcis
 Elmo Langley
 James Hylton
 Richard Petty
 Gary Matthews
 Ed Negre
 Hershel McGriff
 Richard Childress
 Don Puskarich
 Ray Elder
 J.D. McDuffie
 Larry Esau
 Bill Osborne
 Chuck Wahl
 Bill Schmitt
 Richard White
 Don Reynolds
 Sonny Easley
 Ron Esau
 Hugh Pearson
 Benny Parsons
 Glenn Francis
 Pete Torres
 Chuck Bown
 Chuck Little
 G.T. Tallas
 Dick Bown
 Walter Ballard
 Harry Jefferson
 Jimmy Insolo
 Carl Adams
 Ivan Baldwin

Timeline
Section reference: 
 Start: Bobby Allison was leading the racing grid as the green flag was waved.
 Lap 5: Carl Adams noticed that his vehicle was leaking oil.
 Lap 13: Richard Petty took over the lead from Bobby Allison; oil pump issues took Jimmy Insolo out of the event.
 Lap 16: Bobby Allison took over the lead from Richard Petty.
 Lap 17: David Pearson took over the lead from Bobby Allison.
 Lap 18: Bobby Allison took over the lead from David Pearson.
 Lap 28: G.T. Tallas noticed that his vehicle was leaking oil.
 Lap 33: Caution due to Richard Petty's accident on turn 9, ended on lap 35.
 Lap 35: Sonny Easley took over the lead from Bobby Allison.
 Lap 36: Chuck Bown managed to ruin his vehicle's transmission.
 Lap 37: Ray Elder took over the lead from Sonny Easley.
 Lap 38: Bobby Allison took over the lead from Ray Elder.
 Lap 44: The rear end of Glenn Francis' vehicle came off in an unsafe manner; Benny Parson's vehicle suffered from oil pump issues.
 Lap 65: David Pearson took over the lead from Bobby Allison.
 Lap 66: Bobby Allison took over the lead from David Pearson.
 Lap 96: Ron Esau managed to ruin his vehicle's transmission.
 Lap 105: Caution due to oil spills on turns 1 and 8, ended on lap 111.
 Lap 138: David Pearson took over the lead from Bobby Allison.
 Lap 139: Bobby Allison took over the lead from David Pearson.
 Lap 145: Ray Elder managed to render his vehicle's engine non-operable.
 Lap 147: Caution due to Bill Osbourne's problematic engine, ended on lap 153.
 Lap 155: David Pearson took over the lead from Bobby Allison.
 Lap 163: Bobby Allison took over the lead from David Pearson.
 Lap 166: Hershel McGriff noticed that his oil pump was not functioning properly.
 Finish: Bobby Allison was officially declared the winner of the event.

Standings after the race

References

Winston Western
Winston Western
NASCAR races at Riverside International Raceway